"Ageless Beauty" was the fifth single released by the Canadian indie pop group Stars. It was the second single from the critically acclaimed album Set Yourself on Fire. It was featured in a promotional trailer for VH1's show So NoTORIous as well as the pop culture review Best Year Ever.

Music video
A music video for the single was released which follows the experiences of a teenaged girl at a party; as the story unfolds, the camera frequently cuts away to show the band (Stars) playing the song itself. In the narrative portion of the video, a teenaged girl reluctantly enters a house where a party is underway after being encouraged to do so by an older woman, presumably her mother.  As she enters the house, she is confronted by other teenaged party-goers who laugh at her and make derisive gestures and facial expressions.  Making her way to the back of the house, the girl pauses at a mirror, and as she looks at herself in it, a gleam of light suddenly emerges from within her coat.  Startled, she turns to leave, but she is seized by a group of girls who apparently intend to bully her.  They pull her into the living room, and as the girl struggles to free herself, her coat falls open revealing a "galaxy" of stars turning on her chest which in turn projects a larger galaxy on the ceiling of the room.  Amazed, the bullies stand looking up at the rotating galaxy of stars on the ceiling.

2005 songs
Stars (Canadian band) songs